Agodi Gardens is a tourist attraction in the city of Ibadan, Nigeria. Also called Agodi Botanical Gardens, Agodi Gardens, Ibadan, the gardens sit on 150 acres of land

History
Formerly called Agodi Zoological and Botanical Gardens, Agodi Gardens was created in 1967. The garden was destroyed by the Ogunpa flood disaster in 1980 as most of the animals were swept away by the raging water. The garden was renovated in 2012 by the Oyo State Government, and the new Agodi Gardens was reopened in 2014.

Attractions
 Water park
 Lake
 Mini zoo
 Play area and rides for children
 Picnic and Gardens area

Lion attack
In late September 2017, a zookeeper at the Agodi Zoo was attacked by one of the lions. The zookeeper attacked by the lion was Mr. Hamzat Oyekunle popularly known as Baba Olorunwa. He later died from injuries sustained.
The zoo was closed immediately by the Oyo State Government.

References

External links
 
 Agodi Gardens on TripAdvisor

Tourist attractions in Ibadan
Botanical gardens in Nigeria
Parks in Nigeria